Philip d'Aubigny, sometimes Phillip or Phillipe Daubeney (c.a. 1166 – c.a. 1236), a knight and royal chancellor, was one of 5 sons of Ralph d'Aubigny and Sybil Valoignes, whose ancestral home was Saint Aubin-d'Aubigné in Brittany. He was lord of the manor of Chewton Mendip, South Petherton, Bampton, Waltham and Ingleby and Keeper of the Channel Islands.

Life and career 
Following his father's death, Philip's elder brother, Ralph, inherited estates at Belvoir, Ingleby, Saxilby and Broadholme. Ralph, however, later defected to the French in 1205. Philip and at least two of his brothers entered the service of Robert de Breteuil, earl of Leicester, and he was granted the manor of Waltham.

Philip was present at the signing of Magna Carta as a member of the king's party, and was mentioned within the document. He participated in First Barons War and was leader of the royalist forces in Kent and Sussex. He participated in the Battle of Lincoln in 1217, and commanded a ship during the Battle of Sandwich later that same year.

Following the Pro-Angevin victory in the war he was made the tutor of the young Henry III. For his role in the king's education, d'Aubigny was granted the manors of Chewton Mendip and South Petherton in Somerset, and Bampton in Oxfordshire.

Death and burial
In 1235, d'Aubigny set out on crusade with his brother Oliver. However, Philip died in the Holy Land a year later, and was subsequently buried in front of the Church of the Holy Sepulchre at Jerusalem. His inscribed ledger stone displaying his arms was discovered in 1925, in excellent condition, and was lowered slightly below floor-level to protect it from future foot-fall wear and covered by an iron grille. The official record states:
Thanks to the fact that for a long period it was protected by a stone divan built over it for the use of the Moslem guards, the tombstone is in a tolerably good state of preservation. In 1925, during the British Mandate over Palestine, an excavation of the grave for purposes of restoration uncovered Sir Philip’s bones as well as tablets inscribed in Latin describing his family tree. Based on these explorations, Sir Ronald Storrs, the military governor of Jerusalem, authenticated the tomb and Philip’s lineage in a 1925 article published in The Times of London. The restoration of the grave was carried out by the British Pro-Jerusalem Society headed by Storrs. At that time the tombstone was re-set slightly below the level of the courtyard pavement but left visible through a protective metal grating. Today the slab lies in exactly the same spot, but hidden from view by a well-worn wooden hatch.

Succession
As Philip left no legitimate children, his estate in South Petherton and a majority of his Lincolnshire lands were granted to his nephew, Ralph d'Aubigny, the brother of Philip the younger.

Family 
Philip d'Aubigny was the son of Ralph d'Aubigny and Sybil Valoignes, and grandson of William d'Aubigny. He was of brother of Oliver d'Aubigny, Alice d'Aubigny, John d'Aubigny, Gunnora de Gaunt, William De Stuteville, Matilda d'Aubigney, Ralph d'Aubigny and Elias d'Aubeny.

Oliver d'Aubigny married the widow of the leading royalist Philip of Oldcoates in 1221, and later bequeathed land at Enderby in Leicestershire upon his death to the canons of Croxton Abbey, where he was buried.

Philip d'Aubigny was the cousin of William d'Albigny, one of the twenty-five executors of Magna Carta in 1215.

The d'Aubigny lands of Ingleby and South Petherton remained under their families possession until 1554, when they were granted to John Bourchier, earl of Bath.

References

External links 
 Photographs of Philip d'Aubigny's tomb in Jerusalem

1160s births
1236 deaths
Medieval English knights
People from West Lindsey District